Christopher of Prague, born 29 June 1953 as Radim Pulec is the Orthodox Metropolitan of the Czech lands and Slovakia since 2006 and Archbishop of Prague. He has participated in numerous theological conferences and has represented the Church of the Czech Lands and Slovakia in many venues. Fluent in his native language and also Russian, Greek, German and English, he follows academic pursuits in theology and philosophy, having a doctorate in both.

Biographical timeline
1953: Radim Pulec born in Prague.
1974: Ordained to the diaconate and priesthood.
1979: Completed theological studies at the Orthodox Theological Faculty, Presov, Czechoslovakia.  Went to Moscow Theological Academy.
1984: Completed graduate studies at Moscow Theological Academy.
1987: Completed additional theological studies at the Theological Faculty of the University of Athens, Greece.
1985: Radim was tonsured at Troitse-Sergiyeva Lavra in Sergiyev Posad (then Zagorsk), Russia, and given the name Christopher.
1987: Metropolitan Dorotheus, primate of the Church of Czechoslovakia, elevated Hmk Christopher to archimandrite.  Archim. Christopher served at Prague's Cathedral of Sts. Cyril and Methodius.
1988: Archim. Christopher was consecrated to the episcopacy, over which Metr. Dorotheus presided, and was elected Bishop of Olomouc and Brno.
2000: At repose of Metr. Dorotheus, Bp. Christopher was named Archbishop of Prague and of the Czech Lands, and oversaw the Church's Metropolitan Council.
2 May 2006: After repose of Metr. Nikolaj, Abp. Christopher was chosen (by lot of two names) to be Metropolitan of the Czech Lands and Slovakia.
28 May 2006: Enthronement of Abp. Christopher took place as Metropolitan of the Czech Lands and Slovakia.

Resignation
April 2, 2013. Metropolitan Christopher was accused in Nova television of having sex with women and having children after composition of His monastic vow. Krystof admitted he had two daughters, nevertheless  born before he took the oath as a monk.

April 12, 2013. Metropolitan Christopher abdicated to preserve the unity of the Orthodox Church in Czechia and Slovakia. He said he would take legal action to defend His reputation. The Church is temporarily managed by his Excellence bishop Simeon.

April 18, 2013. A lady who accused the Metropolitan Christopher confessed her lying. The lady delivered her official statement to the Bishops of the Church.

April 19, 2013. Orthodox believers called Metropolitan Christopher to His return to the head of the Church.

May 14, 2013. A synod of the Orthodox church held a hearing of other witnesses. The Orthodox bishops then proclaimed the resignation of Metropolitan Christopher was an adequate step. The synod also denied the possibility that he could become a bishop in any eparchy in Czechia or Slovakia. Metropolitan Christopher said he was willing to undergo DNA testing, but he never did.

Proclamation of Orthodox believers from the Prague Eparchy

References

External links
Official website in the Czech Republic
Article at OrthodoxWiki
OCA press release, May 2, 2006.
Orthodox Church of Czech Lands and Slovakia elects a new primate (in Russian).
Portal-Credo.ru article.

Eastern Orthodox metropolitans
Eastern Orthodox Christians from the Czech Republic
Bishops of the Czech and Slovak Orthodox Church
1953 births
Living people